Clover is a mobile dating app which connects with a user's Facebook account, or their email address. It is available for download for iOS as well as Android devices. Users can choose to turn their GPS location on or off and browse other users' profiles anonymously. Users can interact with each other by liking each other, sending text and multimedia chat messages, sending gifts, requesting dates using the "On Demand Dating" feature, or setup chat groups or group events using the "Mixers" feature. Users can also dislike other users which will remove them from future search results. Finally, users can exclude other users from contacting them based on their age, gender, or location in their privacy settings.

History

Clover launched on the Apple iTunes store on March 17, 2014. and on the Google Play store on June 7, 2016.

Features

The Clover Dating app is free to download and most features in the app are free to use. There are added features offered through a "Premium Clover Subscription" which can be purchased through an iTunes or Google Play account for 1, 3, or 6 months. A 7-day free trial can also be purchased which will give you seven days to try the app for free before subscribing to a monthly subscription.

The app has several free features, including seeing who likes you, who you like, who is a match, viewing profile information and profile photos. If a user likes you, you can chat with each other for free.

"Boosts" are required to feature yourself in the featured banner at the top of the chat screen and can be bought in packages of 1, 5, or 10.

Features which require a "Premium Clover Subscription" include advanced filters for various parameters including interests, intention, height, ethnicity, hair color, eye color, etc. The subscription also allows a user to send chat messages to anyone regardless of it they like the user and seeing when a user has read your chat message via read receipts. Subscribers also get free "Boosts" so that they can feature themselves in the feature strip at the top of the chat screen.

Clover launched a new "On Demand Dating" feature on January 7, 2015, that would let users have the app set up a date for them. Similar to a blind date users can choose the location and time that they wish to have the date and the app will list potential matches. Users can then review their matches and confirm the date. The app also gives suggestions for locations based on price and popularity. This feature is free to use.

On February 22, 2016, Clover launched a new "Mixers" feature which allows users to create online chat groups, or in person meet up groups, for users who share similar interests. Mixers can also be sorted by trending, number of attendees, number of comments, or most recently created. Mixers can also be searched using the search option. This feature is free to use.

User statistics

In its first four months, Clover acquired over 50,000 users with 52% coming from the United States and 16% coming from Canada. Roughly 30% of matches have been made after a user has previously passed on the other user.

By November 2014 the demographics were 69% male and 31% female, with 91% of users aged between 18 and 34 years old.

In March, 2015 Clover surveyed 200,000 of its users, between the ages of 18 and 65, who had used their "On Demand Dating" section to find the top 30 locations people were choosing for their first dates. Starbucks was found to be the top location that users preferred. The survey also found that 52% of women preferred to meet at a coffee shop and 51% of men preferred to meet at a restaurant.

Current executives
 Isaac Raichyk, Founder and CEO

References

External links
 Official website

Geosocial networking
IOS software
Mobile social software
Online dating services of Canada
Internet properties established in 2014